Seven Nights in Japan is a 1976 Anglo-French drama film directed by Lewis Gilbert and starring Michael York, Charles Gray, and Hidemi Aoki.

Story

The film is about seven days in the life of Prince George, who is travelling in Japan for the first time. While there he meets and falls for a local girl, Sumi, who is a bus tour guide. They spend a few days and nights together at her isolated childhood home. When Sumi discovers his true identity she admonishes him for avoiding his duties as the future king (he had absconded from his planned itinerary of factory visits to be with her; he later justifies his absence to the ambassador by asserting that he was simply taking his allotted naval shore leave). Problems also happen as he is hunted by an unknown Japanese Sect who want him dead, as he left one of their nightclubs without paying (having inadvertently run up a huge bill).

Cast
Prince George -	Michael York
Sumi -	                Hidemi Aoki
Finn -	                James Villiers
Captain Balcon -	Peter Jones
Hollander -	        Charles Gray
Jane Hollander -	Anne Lonnberg
Mrs Hollander -	Eléonore Hirt
American tourist -	Lionel Murton
American wife -	Yolande Donlan

Production

The film was inspired by the life of Prince Charles, who was serving in the Royal Navy at the time, and was known for his romantic involvements as well as his need for a suitable wife. In the film 'Prince George' is said to be engaged to a member of the Swedish royal family.

"There are echos of Roman Holiday," said York.

Reception

According to York, the film was a big success in Burma, leading to York being mobbed when he visited.

References

External links

1970 films
Films directed by Lewis Gilbert
1970s adventure comedy-drama films
Films with screenplays by Christopher Wood (writer)
Films about princes
Fictional princes
British adventure comedy-drama films
1970s romantic comedy-drama films
British romantic comedy-drama films
Films set in Japan
Films shot in Japan
EMI Films films
1970 comedy films
1970 drama films
Japan in non-Japanese culture
1970s English-language films
1970s British films